Craig Ailey is a villa at Cove, originally named Italian Villa. The site above a craig (cliff) gives views over the Firth of Clyde and its junction with Loch Long. It was designed in 1850 by Alexander Thomson (later known as "Greek Thomson"), and built around 1852 by his client the builder and developer John McElroy, who had feued land in the Cove and Kilcreggan area from the 8th Duke of Argyll.  Access to the house is by South Ailey Road. The house, on top of the craig above Craigrownie Cottage, can be seen from Shore Road.

Notes

References
 

Category A listed buildings in Argyll and Bute
Houses completed in 1852
1850 in Scotland